Faryabi is a village in Fedagh Rural District, Central District, Gerash County, Fars Province, Iran. At the 2016 census, its population was 183, in 28 families.

References 

Populated places in Gerash County